Ștefan Bârsănescu (28 March 1895—5 November 1984) was a Romanian academician and educator who gained renown as an essayist and philosopher.

Born in the village of Viperești in Buzău County, a part of the historical region of Muntenia, Ștefan Bârsănescu was a member of the Romanian Academy and the author of over thirty scholarly volumes and more than five hundred articles and essays. He died in Iași four-and-a-half months before his 90th birthday.

Selected bibliography
  - (1932)
  - (1935)
  - (1936)
  - (1939)
  - (1946)
  - (1946)
  - (1951)
  - (1957)
  - (1962)
  - (1971)
  - (1978, in collaboration with Florela Bârsănescu)
  - (1983)

External links
 Biography - Stefan Barsanescu

Romanian essayists
Corresponding members of the Romanian Academy
People from Buzău County
1895 births
1984 deaths
20th-century essayists
20th-century Romanian philosophers